Baraxum (also, Barakhum and Beyuk-Barakhum) is a village in the Khachmaz Rayon of Azerbaijan.  The village forms part of the municipality of Uzunoba.

References 

Populated places in Khachmaz District